Vojkovice may refer to places in the Czech Republic:

Vojkovice (Brno-Country District), a municipality and village in the South Moravian Region
Vojkovice (Frýdek-Místek District), a municipality and village in the Moravian-Silesian Region
Vojkovice (Karlovy Vary District), a municipality and village in the Karlovy Vary Region
Vojkovice (Mělník District), a municipality and village in the Central Bohemian Region

See also
Hostín u Vojkovic, a municipality and village in the Czech Republic
Wojkowice (disambiguation)